Dorcadion lativittis is a species of beetle in the family Cerambycidae. It was described by Kraatz in 1878.

See also 
Dorcadion

References

lativittis
Beetles described in 1878